This is a list of Dutch television related events from 2009.

Events
9 May - Lisa Hordijk wins the second series of X Factor.
29 May - 12-year-old singer and guitarist Tessa Kersten wins the second series of Holland's Got Talent.
3 July - Singer and winner of the first series of Idols Jamai Loman and his partner Gwyneth van Rijn win the fourth and final series of Dancing with the Stars.

Debuts

Television shows

1950s
NOS Journaal (1956–present)

1970s
Sesamstraat (1976–present)

1980s
Jeugdjournaal (1981–present)
Het Klokhuis (1988–present)

1990s
Goede tijden, slechte tijden (1990–present)

2000s
X Factor (2006–present)
Holland's Got Talent (2008–present)

Ending this year
Dancing with the Stars (2005-2009)
De Club van Sinterklaas (1999-2009)

Births

Deaths

See also
 2009 in the Netherlands